Sholinganallur, also spelled Solinganalloor or Sozhinganalloor, is a locality in the southern part of Chennai, India.

Etymology
The etymology given by Tamil scholars is "Chola" + "Angam" + "Nallur", which indicates that Sholinganallur was once part of a Chola settlement, most likely during the 8th century before which this used to be a marshland with a mango forest.

Demographics
 India census, the population of Sholinganallur reached about 7.5 lakhs, making it one of the most densely populated places in Tamil Nadu.
The Sholinganallur Assembly constituency witnessed the highest population influx in Tamil Nadu in the last seven years. According to the official final electoral list released in 2021, the number of voters has risen to 6,94,845 electors.  Sholinganallur continues to be the largest Assembly constituency in Tamil Nadu in terms of the number of voters. The number of the male voters is 3,48,262, female is 3,46,476, and transpersons is 107.

Religion
There are several temples, churches and mosques in the area.

The town is well renowned for Sholinganallur Prathyangira Devi Temple, visited by the devotees including from those outside the city. The temple is located close to the Sholinganallur junction and halfway down the link road of ECR and OMR.

Government and politics  
Sholinganallur (state assembly constituency) is the biggest assembly constituency in Tamil Nadu in terms of voters.

Civic Administration  
Sholinganallur was annexed in to Chennai Corporation in 2011, and it is the last (200th) ward of Chennai city, administered as a part of Chennai Corporation.

Other Authorities
Sholinganallur has a Regional Transport Office (RTO), near Sholinganallur Main Signal.  The vehicle registration code is TN-14.

Economy
Chiefly residential, the rapid growth of Sholinganallur's economy, population and infrastructure can be attributed to information technology business parks and dedicated special economic zones (SEZ). Solinganalloor is surrounded by other IT based suburbs such as Siruseri, Perungudi and Taramani. Tamil Nadu government's TIDCO is building a Financial City in Solinganalloor to house global financial corporations. 
Solinganalloor has become the IT corridor for Chennai city since major IT companies and major workforce (around 2 lakh (200,000) employees) are located in this region.

Sholinganallur is home to a number of BPO and IT/ITES companies.  Many major IT companies including Wipro, Infosys, Tata Consultancy Services, Automotive Robotics, Flintobox, 4iapps solutions, PayPal, eBay, Exemplarr Worldwide, HCL Technologies, Cognizant (CTS), Tech Mahindra, Screen Plus have their own facilities in Sholinganallur.  Many major IT/ITES companies including Accenture India, eBay, Trident Solutions, American Megatrends, PayPal have their presence here.

Housing

The suburb's population continues to grow rapidly as more and more employees and family of IT professionals (employed in the neighborhood) continue to move in and take up residence at Sholinganallur. Proximity to employment opportunities, good asset appreciation, outstanding road infrastructure, proximity to beaches at ECR and other entertainment venues continues to attract more residents to this suburb.

The Tamil Nadu Housing Board (TNHB) has created a satellite township at Shollinganallur with IT Parks, arterial roads, schools, parks, play grounds and bus Terminus. The TNHB township of 4,000 dwellings is situated next to the upcoming  Rs1,000 crore National Maritime university complex.  Budget serviced apartments are available, which are mostly used by corporates.

Popular restaurants such as Agusthya, Ponnusamy (Chettinad), Daawath (Mughal) and Thamburan (Malabar) are located here. Hanumaya mess and Bhaskar Andhra Mess are two local low budget cafeterias popular with people from all walks of life.

Residential areas of Sholinganallur include Akkarai, Panaiyur, Rajiv Gandhi Nagar, MGR Nagar, Ganesh Nagar and Uthandi (ECR Toll Plaza), which are located on the East Coast Road.  Uthandi has a public beach that has been declared as a "turtle nesting site" where the endangered Olive Ridley turtles come to nest and lay their eggs.

Transport

By Air  
Chennai International Airport at Meenambakkam is the nearest airport.

By Rail  
The Government is constructing Metro Train-Phase 2 along this route from Madhavaram till Siruseri IT park (deadline to be operational for this Corridor-3 and Corridor-5 by 2024/26.

By Road  
Sholinganallur is located at the junction connecting East Coast Road to Tambaram, Mudichur and Adyar to Mahabalipuram, along Old Mahabalipuram Road. It is an important junction in Southern part of Greater Chennai. It is at a distance of 14.3 km from Tambaram, 2 km away from East Coast Road (ECR), 34.8 km away from Mamallapuram and 13.5 km away from Adyar. Sholinganallur is connected by road ways. Many IT companies are located within 5 km. It is connected with the city with MTC & TNSTC-villupuram and many share autorichshaws.

Places

Hospitals
Multi-speciality hospitals located around Sholinganallur are Adithya Bone & Joint Speciality Clinic, LifeLine Multi Speciality Hospital, Global Hospitals, Chettinad Hospitals, Swaram Hospitals, Life care, Om Sakthi Clinic and Physio Pulze Physiotherapy Clinic.

Schools
Some schools here are Government Higher Secondary School, Sacred Heart Matriculation Higher Secondary School, Sacred Heart Global school (CBSE), Gateway School, Ellen Sharma Matriculation Higher Secondary School, Sree Iyyapa Matriculation Higher Secondary School, Bala Vidya Mandir, Amelio Early Learning Center, Babaji Vidhyashram School,Ramana vidyalaya.

Colleges
Colleges include St Joseph's Institute of Technology(A Unit of St Joseph's college of engineering) KCG College of Technology(A Unit of Hindustan Group of Institutions), Jeppiaar Engineering College, Sathyabama University, St. Mary's School of Management Studies, Jeppiaar SRR engineering college, St. Joseph's College of Engineering, Sri Sivasubramaniya Nadar College of Engineering, Thangavelu Engineering college,Shree Motilal Kanhaiyalal Fomra Institute of Technology (13 km from Sholinganallur), Ragas Dental college, Mohamed Sathak College of Arts and Science, Anand Institute of Technology (8 km from Sholinganallur), NTTF Information Technology Centre, Nr MTL Sholinganallur, Head Office Telichery Kannur.

The Indian Maritime University, Chennai campus is located in Uthandi, Sholinganallur. The university complex will also house an Aquarium, National Maritime Museum, Food Courts, Hotel and a residential complex. The Ministry of Shipping is seeking public private partnership to build a five star hotel in the complex.

References

Cities and towns in Chennai district
Suburbs of Chennai